The Piako River is a lowland river system that drains into the Firth of Thames on the North Island of New Zealand. Together with the Waihou River, it is one of the two main rivers systems which drains the Hauraki Plains.  It is the dominant river system in the Matamata-Piako District, and on its journey it passes through the towns of Morrinsville and Ngatea.

The Piako River has two major stems: the first, and main, stem drains the northern Te Miro-Tahuroa hills, and the Pakaroa Range. The dominant tributaries on the eastern slopes of these hills are the Piakonui and Piakoiti Streams. These streams, together with the smaller Toenepi Stream, converge just south of Kereone to become the Piako River. The western slopes are drained by the Waitakaruru Stream which joins the Piako River at Morrinsville. As the Piako River progresses north, it is fed by numerous small streams draining the eastern slopes of the Hangawera Hills.

The second stem is the Waitoa River, which starts near Piarere. The Waitoa River catchment drains the Hinuera Flats and broad southern Hauraki Plains, before converging with the Piako River in the large wetland known as the Kopuatai Peat Dome, northeast of Tahuna. The Upper Piako River catchment also drains the eastern aspects of the Hapuakohe Range through small tributaries.

The river system is highly modified by intensive dairy farming and associated industry. Given this, the Toenepi Stream - a small sub-catchment of the Piako River - has been extensively used to research the impact of intensive farming on water quality and develop improved farming practices.

Drainage and flood protection 
In 1906 work started on cutting the bends in the river below Kaihere Landing. Since the 1930s, considerable flood protection measures have been undertaken on the Piako River and surrounding catchment, especially mainly north of Paeroa-Tahuna Road and the Kopuatai Peat Dome. The scheme includes river management works, river diversions and channel enlargement, ponding systems, floodway improvements, stopbanks, floodgates and pumps. However, the river flooded again in 2017. A 2018 plan provides for strengthened stopbanks and diversion ponds.

The scheme works includes the following:
 Main river and tributary channel enlargement and clearing work,
 170 km of stopbanks,
 59 floodgates and
 32 pump stations

The scheme provides the following levels of service:
 100-year protection from tidal flooding with  freeboard,
 50-year protection from Piako River flooding with  freeboard

Piako River Bridge (Ngatea)
The original Piako River Bridge was built in Ngatea and opened in 1917. In the earliest days all transport or access to and from the land was either by sea, river or canal, but with the first roads being developed, it was essential that a bridge be built over the Piako River so it could become a main route between Auckland and Tauranga. Considerable work has gone into restoring the banks of the river, as in winter it is the direct cause of flooding through the low-lying Hauraki Plains.

References

Rivers of Waikato
Rivers of New Zealand
Firth of Thames
Hauraki Gulf catchment